Mackenzie Johnson, better known by his stage name Makj (stylized as MAKJ), is an American DJ and electro house music producer. He has released a number of singles as a solo artist since 2012, as well as a large number of collaborative singles with artists such as Hardwell, Lil Jon, Deorro and M35. Since 2013 Makj has performed at large festivals such as Electric Zoo, Voodoo Experience, Coachella, and a main stage slot at TomorrowWorld. In March 2014, Billboard named him one of the Top 10 Artists to Watch at Ultra Music Festival. Also in 2014 he was named No. 63 in the Top 100 DJs list put out by the DJ Magazine Awards. Makj is the host of the radio show Revolution Radio on Clear Channel’s Evolution channel.

Biography
Mackenzie Johnson was born in 1990 in San Luis Obispo, California. By his teens, he was living in China while pursuing a career as a professional race car driver. At age fifteen, he became interested in DJing, and he purchased a set of Technics 1200 Turntables. By age 17, he had returned to the United States, where he found himself invited to perform at local events in his hometown. He had a number of lessons with DJ AM, who trained Makj on scratching.

In late 2013, Makj embarked on his first major US tour, traveling the country with Bingo Players and Bassjackers. After a time playing small venues, he began to attend festivals as well. Since 2013, he has performed at festivals such as Electric Zoo Festival, Voodoo Experience, Coachella, a main stage slot at TomorrowWorld, Northern Lights Festival, Euphoria Festival, Webster Hall, and Ruby Skye. In March 2014, Billboard named him one of the Top 10 Artists to Watch at Ultra Music Festival. He toured Europe in 2014 with his "Let’s Get Fucked Up Tour," then traveled North America with his "Peyote Tour." Plans for an Asian tour were also announced.

He has released a number of singles as a solo artist since 2012, as well as a large number of collaborative singles. He has collaborated with artists such as Showtek, Lil Jon, and DJ Kura. In 2013, he released a collaborative single with Hardwell entitled "Countdown" which peaked at No. 1 on Beatport within three days. He has also released music on Hysteria Records, Doorn Records, Diffused Records, and Juicy Music, among others. In late 2014, he released his track "Generic," which had earlier debuted at the Ultra Festival in Miami. Several of his original songs have charted in the Beatport Top 10.
 
Makj has been a guest judge for the Campus DJ contest, and he is the host of a radio show on Clear Channel’s Evolution channel, with the show also streaming at iHeartRadio and 101.7 Boston.

Awards and nominations

Singles

As lead artist

Other singles

 2011: Parallax (with Kura and dBerrie)
 2012: Crunch
 2012: Croche
 2012: Galaxy / Old Memories (with Kura)
 2013: Conchy
 2013: Hold Up
 2013: Springen
 2013: Hakaka
 2013: Revolution (with M35)
 2014: GO (Showtek Edit) (with M35)
 2014: Generic
 2014: Ready (with Deorro)
 2015: Lose Your Mind (with Deorro)
 2015: Ante Up (with Deorro)
 2015: Get Whoa (featuring Fly Boi Keno)
 2015: On & On (with Kenze)
 2017: Knock Me Down (with Max Styler featuring Elayna Boynton)
 2017: Space Jam (with Michael Sparks featuring Fatman Scoop)
 2017: Too Far Gone (featuring Matthew Santos)

Remixes
 2012: Nari & Milani featuring Maurizio Gubellini - Unbelievable (with Robbie Rivera)
 2012: Drop the Lime - No Sleep For The Wicked
 2013: Trinidad James - All Gold Everything
 2013: Nervo and Ivan Gough featuring Beverly Knight - Not Taking This No More
 2013: Federico Scavo and Robbie Rivera - Jump
 2013: Sound of Stereo - Zipper
 2013: Sandro Silva featuring Jack Miz - Let Go Tonight
 2014: Benny Benassi featuring Gary Go - Let This Last Forever
 2015: O.T. Genasis - CoCo
 2016: Rae Sremmurd - Black Beatles
 2016: Madly - Work Me
 2017: Ed Sheeran - Shape of You
 2017: Future - Mask Off
 2017: Steve Aoki featuring Lil Yachty and Migos - Night Call (with Steve Aoki)
 2019: Goody Grace featuring Blink-182 - Scumbag
 2020: Winona Oak - He Don't Love Me
 2020: Rat City - I Just Wanna Dance

Further reading

Makj at Allmusic
Makj at Discogs

References

External links

Living people
1990 births
People from San Luis Obispo, California
American DJs
American electronic musicians
Revealed Recordings artists
Electronic dance music DJs